In the run-up to the 2025 Chilean presidential election, opinion polls are conducted to assess the intention to vote in Chile during the presidential term of Gabriel Boric. The date range for these opinion polls runs from the first measurement in October 2022, to the day the election is held, 23 November 2025.

Various polls are listed below in reverse chronological order (with the most recent polls first). The order considers the last day of the sampling and only when that period is not known, the date of publication of the poll is shown.

Opinion polls before candidate registration 
Potential candidates are arranged on the left-right axis according to the coalition or party they belong to, with independents, who are outside any coalition, to the right of the table. The highest percentage for each survey is shown shaded and in bold.

Graphical summary

2022

See also 

 Opinion polling for the 2021 Chilean presidential election

Notes

References 

Opinion polling in Chile
Chile